Microsoft Lumia (previously the Nokia Lumia) is a discontinued line of mobile devices that was originally designed and marketed by Nokia and later by Microsoft Mobile. Introduced in November 2011, the line was the result of a long-term partnership between Nokia and Microsoft—as such, Lumia smartphones run on Microsoft software, the Windows Phone operating system; and later the newer Windows 10 Mobile. The Lumia name is derived from the partitive plural form of the Finnish word lumi, meaning "snow".

On 3 September 2013, Microsoft announced its purchase of Nokia's mobile device business, with the deal closing on 25 April 2014. As a result, the Lumia line's maintenance was transferred to Microsoft Mobile. As part of the transition, Microsoft continued to use the Nokia brand on Lumia devices until October 2014, when it began to officially phase out the Nokia name in its promotion and production of smartphones in favor of Microsoft branding. In November 2014, Microsoft announced the first Microsoft (non-Nokia) branded Lumia device, the Lumia 535. In October 2015, Microsoft announced the first Lumia devices running on Windows 10 Mobile, the Lumia 950, Lumia 950 XL and Lumia 550. The most recent Lumia smartphone, the Lumia 650, was announced by Microsoft on 15 February 2016.

Sales decreased sharply after the introduction of Windows 10 in 2015 and Microsoft briefly stopped selling Lumia devices from the Microsoft Store at the end of 2016—by which time sales were estimated to have dropped below one million units—although availability was restored at the beginning of 2017. In October 2017, Microsoft's corporate vice president, Joe Belfiore, confirmed that Microsoft would no longer sell or manufacture new Windows 10 Mobile devices. The existing devices would receive bug fixes and security updates only, ending for the latest devices in December 2019.

History 
From 1998 to 2012, Nokia was the largest vendor of mobile phones in the world, which included early smartphones built on its Symbian platform. However, in recent years, its market share declined as a result of the growing use of touchscreen smartphones from other vendors, such as Apple's iPhone line and Android-based products. In 2010, its market share had declined to 28%, and in April 2012, Samsung Electronics (a prominent user of Android) ultimately overtook Nokia as the largest mobile phone vendor in the world. Nokia's CEO Stephen Elop vetoed the idea of producing Android devices, believing the company wouldn't be able to suitably differentiate its Android products from that of other vendors. In an employee memo, Elop infamously described the company as being on a "burning platform", blaming the "war of ecosystems" between iOS and Android as part of Nokia's overall struggle, and asserting that the company needed to make major changes to its operation.

Partnership between Microsoft and Nokia 

In February 2011, Stephen Elop and Microsoft's CEO Steve Ballmer jointly announced a major business partnership between Nokia and Microsoft, which would see Nokia adopt Windows Phone as its primary platform on future smartphones, replacing both Symbian and MeeGo. The deal also included the integration of Bing as the search engine on Nokia devices, and the integration of Nokia Maps into Microsoft's own mapping services. Nokia had planned to use the MeeGo platform as part of its future plans prior to the announcement, although the company announced that it would still release one MeeGo device in 2011. Aligning with Microsoft had been considered a possibility by analysts due to Elop's prior employment with the company.

Nokia unveiled its first Windows Phone 7-based devices, the mid-range Lumia 710 and high-end Lumia 800, on 26 October 2011 at its Nokia World conference. Motivated by requests from the U.S. carrier AT&T for an LTE-enabled device, Nokia quickly developed the Lumia 900 as a follow-up, first unveiled at the 2012 International CES. The Lumia 900 received heavy promotion by the carrier as a flagship device, but its launch was dampened by a software bug that prevented the device from connecting to certain mobile data networks, forcing AT&T to issue credits to those who purchased the device. Upon its launch in April 2012, the Lumia 900 was listed as a top seller on Amazon.com, but online sales began to taper off by May. While not revealing further details, a Nokia representative stated that the company was "pleased with the consumer reaction, as well as the support we have received from AT&T", while AT&T's mobility chief Ralph de la Vega stated that the Lumia 900 had "exceeded expectations".

In early 2012, Nokia released the Lumia 610, a new entry-level device taking advantage of the lower system requirements introduced by Windows Phone 7's "Tango" update. These new low-end devices were intended to improve Windows Phone adoption in emerging markets such as China. In June 2012, both Nokia and Microsoft received much criticism after it was revealed that the Windows Phone 7 Lumia devices will not be upgradable to Microsoft's second generation Windows Phone platform, Windows Phone 8. It has been said that those devices won't be upgraded because Windows Phone 8 uses an entirely different kernel (Windows NT). The original Lumia range instead received a different update called Windows Phone 7.8.

Later in September 2012, Nokia unveiled the Lumia 820 and the Lumia 920, its first two devices to use Windows Phone 8. Both featured NFC, with the Lumia 820 embedding a microSD card slot, and an optional Wireless Charging Shell for Qi wireless charging. The Lumia 920 also notably featured Qi wireless charging, and a "PureView" camera with optical image stabilization. While Nokia received criticism when it was revealed that a demonstration video of its image stabilization technology was, in fact, filmed using a professional camera, the Lumia 920 was a commercial success for the company.

At MWC 2013, Nokia introduced two more Windows Phone 8 devices: the mid-range Nokia Lumia 720 and the budget Nokia Lumia 520, the latter of which has become the highest selling Windows phone device ever. In 2013, Nokia also introduced the Lumia 925, a revised version of the 920 with a slimmer build incorporating aluminium, and the Lumia 1020, which features a 41-megapixel camera based on technology from its Symbian-based 808 PureView. On 22 October 2013, Nokia extended the Lumia brand into the tablet market with the unveiling of the Lumia 2520; running Microsoft's Windows RT operating system, it was the company's first tablet since the Nokia Internet tablet range. Some critics believed that the usage of Windows RT rather than full Microsoft Windows 8.1 led to bad sales, as most major Windows tablet makers have used Windows 8.1 in favour of Windows RT. Alternatively, others have claimed that the device's failure was due to its heavy weight and high price. Lumia 2520 was discontinued in early 2015.

Although sales of the Lumia line had exceeded those of BlackBerry in the same period, Nokia still made an operating loss of €115m, with revenues falling 24% to €5.7bn following the second quarter of 2013. Over the past nine quarters, Nokia sustained €4.1 billion worth of operating losses. In Q3 2013, Lumia sales hit 8.8 million worldwide; over three times higher than the same period the year before; and double the figure in North America compared to the previous quarter. At the same time, overall Windows Phone market share hit double figures in several countries in Europe and other regions.

Acquisition of Nokia's mobile phone business 

On 3 September 2013, Microsoft announced its intent to acquire Nokia's mobile phone business (including rights to the Lumia and low-end Asha brands) in an overall deal of over US$7bn. Stephen Elop stepped down as Nokia's CEO and returned to Microsoft as its head of devices as part of the deal, which closed in early 2014. While Microsoft will license the Nokia name under a 10-year agreement, the company will only be able to use it on feature phones: those running the Series 30, Series 30+ and the Series 40 mobile operating systems based on Java ME and MediaTek technology, respectively. These changes resulted in future Lumia models being first-party hardware produced by Microsoft.

Codenames for Lumia phones developed from late 2013 were based on James Bond movies, including "Moneypenny" (which became Nokia Lumia 630) and "Goldfinger" (which would be the cancelled Lumia "McLaren").

Android prototypes 

On 13 September 2013, the New York Times writer Nick Wingfield revealed that Nokia had been testing the Android operating system on its Lumia hardware. It was one of two known Android projects at the company; the other was running the OS on low–end Asha hardware, which resulted in the Nokia X family of devices. Despite the testing, the Android-based Lumia handsets were never released and only altered Asha devices were brought to the market.

In July 2014, Microsoft announced that it would discontinue the majority of its Nokia-branded devices, including the Asha, S30, S40, and X platforms, in favor of low-cost Lumia devices inheriting their design. This left S30+ as Microsoft's only remaining Nokia-branded phone platform until it was sold to HMD Global in May 2016, who, the following February, would announce the first Nokia-branded true Android phone, the Nokia 6, in January 2017.

Under Microsoft ownership 

Even after the acquisition of Nokia's mobile device business by Microsoft, several Lumia devices were unveiled by Microsoft Mobile in September 2014 that still carried the Nokia name, including the Lumia 830 and Lumia 735. In July 2014, it had been reported by evleaks that Microsoft was attempting to license the Nokia name in a co-branding scheme, which would have possibly seen future devices branded as "Nokia by Microsoft". As a part of the change of ownership, the social network pages have also been rebranded as Microsoft Lumia rather than Microsoft Mobile; this sought to emphasize the Windows Phone over other Nokia mobile phones while also updating social network pages of Windows Phone to the new Microsoft Lumia branding. To reflect this change, Nokia Conversations was also rebranded as Lumia Conversations, and NokNok.tv to Lumia Conversations UK. However, the rebranding has not been consistent, as the Nokia Army was renamed the Spartan Nation and the support site for legacy phones, accessories, various Nokia-branded devices, and services, originally Nokia Discussions, was renamed the Microsoft Mobile Community. The Lumia Beamer was the last Lumia-branded application to have its URL changed from Nokia to Lumia, signifying the end of the transitional term during which Microsoft was allowed to use Nokia.com and related sites.

However, in October 2014, Microsoft officially announced that it would phase out the Nokia brand in its promotion and production of Lumia smartphones, and that future Lumia models would be branded solely with the name and logo of Microsoft. In November 2014, Microsoft announced its first self-branded phone, Microsoft Lumia 535. Rebranding the Lumia line did not affect sales, though some critics believed that it might negatively influence consumers' decisions due to Nokia's established reputation for durability compared to the relative infancy of Microsoft's brand in the consumer phone space. The Nokia Lumia 638 was the last Lumia product to bear the Nokia brand, and was only released in India in December 2014.

In November 2014, a post by a Microsoft Twitter account stated that all Nokia and Microsoft Lumia smartphones running Windows Phone 8 and 8.1 would receive updates to Windows 10; however, following the official unveiling, Microsoft denied this, stating that they instead were targeting the "majority" of Lumia phones and that not all phones would receive the update or support all of its features. Later, Microsoft confirmed that low-end devices with 512 MB of RAM (including the Nokia Lumia 520, which represents 24.5% of all Windows Phone devices sold), would also get the Windows 10 upgrade, but reaffirmed that not all of its features would be supported on these devices. Additionally, Microsoft stated on January 16, 2015, that low-end Windows Phone 8.1 phones will not get some Lumia Denim features.

In July 2015, Bloomberg reported that Microsoft had a planned restructuring of Microsoft Mobile, which includes the Microsoft Lumia range. This would reportedly include a write down of approximately US$7.6 billion on the acquisition of Nokia's mobile phone business and a layoff of around 7,200 employees. It was also reported that Microsoft would release fewer first-party devices each year. As part of a larger restructuring, the Microsoft Devices & Studios engineering group was merged with the Operating Systems Engineering Group to form the larger Windows & Devices Engineering Group. In July 2015, it was announced that the head of Surface, Panos Panay, would head the new Microsoft devices unit, which would include the Microsoft Lumia as well as various other Microsoft hardware products such as the Band, HoloLens, and Xbox.

In October 2015, Microsoft launched the first Lumia devices running on Windows 10 Mobile: the Lumia 950, Lumia 950 XL and Lumia 550. In February 2016, the Lumia 650, which also runs Windows 10 Mobile, was launched. Sales of Lumia devices declined between fiscal years 2015 and 2016, with phone revenue decreasing by $4.2 billion or 56%. When Microsoft announced the acquisition in September 2013, 7.3 million devices were sold in the quarter, but this shrunk to 1.2 million at the quarter ending June 2016. Since the Lumia series make up 95% of total Windows Phone/Windows 10 Mobile sales, the operating system market share also shrunk along with it. Throughout 2016 Microsoft slowed down production volumes of Lumia devices, and it was speculated that the series would be discontinued by the end of 2016.

Shortly after the discontinuation of the Elite X3, HP's attempt to bring Windows 10 Mobile to a niche market, Microsoft's corporate vice president Joe Belfiore confirmed that Microsoft would no longer sell or manufacture new mobile devices. The existing devices would receive bug fixes and security updates only.

Lumia updates 

Nokia and Microsoft Mobile have released several updates unique to Lumia devices which feature a combination of firmware and software updates. The latter of these includes imaging improvements, new technology support, feature updates, and bug fixes. Because Lumia devices exclusively use Windows Phone, major operating system updates are often bundled with the firmware updates upon release.

Similar to how Windows Phones receive operating system updates, Lumia update releases are dependent on carriers who decide if and when devices are to receive them. However, operating system updates are not subject to these constraints if users are part of Microsoft's Windows Insider or Preview for Developers programs.

List of Lumia devices 
All devices in the Lumia line were smartphones (including one tablet computer) running Microsoft Windows software. All the smartphones were full-touch in a candybar form. There were no QWERTY devices, although there were reports in 2012 that Nokia was working on such device similar to the Nokia Eseries. An alleged prototype device with full keyboard was leaked in 2017.

Numbering convention 
The first digit (or the first two digits for devices with four-digit model numbers) indicates the device's family, with larger numbers generally denoting a higher-end device. Under Nokia, numbers larger than 10 indicated a phablet (e.g. 1320, 1520) or tablet (2520). Following the sale of the Lumia line to Microsoft, four-digit model numbers were discontinued, with larger models instead being denoted by an "XL" suffix (e.g. 950 XL).

The second digit indicates the generation of the device, based on the operating system it originally shipped with:

The third digit is used to distinguish between variants in the same family and generation. 0 indicates the base model, while other numbers indicate either a minor upgrade (e.g. 920 and 925), a 4G-capable variant (e.g. 730 and 735) or a regional or carrier-specific variant.

An optional "C" or "T" suffix indicates a variant produced exclusively for the Chinese market.

Nokia-branded Lumia devices

Microsoft-branded Lumia devices

Comparison of Lumia smartphones

Sales 

Graph of quarterly global sales (million units)

See also 
 Lumia imaging apps
 Microsoft Surface
 Microsoft hardware
 Microsoft Kin
 Nokia X family
 Nokia Asha series

References

External links 

 
Nokia Lumia Series: The Champion of Generations!

 
Microsoft franchises
Windows Phone devices
Microsoft hardware
Lumia
Videotelephony
Mobile phones introduced in 2011
Products and services discontinued in 2017